Lee Soon-oh (born 4 October 1953) is a South Korean former professional tennis player.

Lee, an All-Korea singles champion, was active on tour in the 1970s. In 1972 she won the Hong Kong Hardcourt mixed doubles title (with Colin Dibley). She appeared in singles and doubles main draws at the 1973 Australian Open. In 1974 she won two medals for South Korea at the Asian Games in Tehran, a gold in the team event and silver in women's doubles. She featured in six Federation Cup ties for South Korea during her career, all as a doubles specialist.

References

External links
 
 
 

1953 births
Living people
South Korean female tennis players
Asian Games medalists in tennis
Asian Games gold medalists for South Korea
Asian Games silver medalists for South Korea
Medalists at the 1974 Asian Games
Tennis players at the 1974 Asian Games